Moonlit Landscape is a c. 1616 oil on canvas landscape painting by Guercino, a rare instance of pure landscape in his work. It is now in the Nationalmuseum in Stockholm, to which it was donated in 1936 by court official Gösta Stenman via the Nationalmusei Vänner.

References

Paintings in the collection of the Nationalmuseum Stockholm
Landscape paintings
Paintings by Guercino
1616 paintings
Paintings in Stockholm